Selcë is a settlement in the former Kelmend municipality, Shkodër County, northern Albania. At the 2015 local government reform it became part of the municipality Malësi e Madhe.
The terrace of Gërçe, a rocky formation between two limestone crags, is in the village.

Church

Notable People

References

Kelmend (municipality)
Populated places in Malësi e Madhe
Villages in Shkodër County